In E. coli and other bacteria, holE is a gene that encodes the theta subunit of DNA polymerase III.

References 

Bacterial proteins
DNA replication